Roti sai mai ("sai mai"), also known as roti-wrapped candy floss or Ayutthaya's cotton candy, is a Southeast Asian dessert from Thailand.  is an Islamic-influenced dessert served by wrapping cotton candy in sweet roti.

The rolling floss or cotton candy is thin, silky strings of spun sugar, found in a variety of hues. The roti (flatbread) is very thin and made from white or colored flour; green flour colored using pandan leaves. Sesame is often sprinkled on the top.

History

Origins 
The recipe was initially brought to the Ayutthaya Kingdom by Muslim traders, who produced and marketed the sweet among communities. The tasty dessert was commonly sold at roadside booths in both the city and the countryside.

Marketing

Coin-operated roti sai mai 
In the 1980s and 1990s, "coin-operated"  could be found in markets. These sellers had small bicycles equipped with coin boxes on the backs. Customers would drop a 10 baht coin through the slot, and a rotating dial would spin, cycling through the numbers 3–7. The number the dial ended on was the number of pieces of  the customer would get. This popular marketing gimmick allowed customers to "try their luck", and earn more pieces for the same coin. Customers could also just buy pieces at the normal price.

Nowadays, these coin-operated sellers are extremely rare.

International marketing 
The dough and floss candy must be consumed within a few days, or the dessert's flavour will degrade, and it will spoil not soon after. The company Candy Crepe, founded by Jainnisa Kuvinichkul, collaborated with the National Science and Technology Development Agency of Thailand to increase the dessert's shelf-life. Their product has a shelf life of 6–12 months without the use of chemical additives.

References

External links 
 board.postjung.com
 Making roti sai mai

Thai desserts and snacks